Tommy Tallarico (born February 18, 1968) is an American video game music composer, musician, sound designer, television personality, live show creative director and producer. He and his company, Tommy Tallarico Studios, worked on several video games since the 1990s. He co-hosted the television shows Electric Playground and Reviews on the Run from 1997 until 2006. In 2002, he created Video Games Live (VGL), a global video game music orchestra.

In 2018, after he became the president of Intellivision Entertainment, the company began work on and sought investors for an original video game console named the Intellivision Amico, for which Tallarico was frequently present in pitch videos. He has since stepped down from his position as CEO, but remains on the company's board as president.

In 2020, it came to Tallarico's attention that a sound effect he owned from a game Tommy Tallarico Studios worked on, Messiah, was used without permission in the video game Roblox. This led to a legal dispute which ended in 2022 with the removal of the sound effect from the game.

Early life
Tommy Tallarico grew up in Springfield, Massachusetts, later attending Cathedral High School. He told The Washington Post in an interview he would take his father's tape recorder to the arcade to record songs as a child. After graduating high school, Tallarico attended Western New England University for a year. According to the Los Angeles Times, Tallarico moved to Southern California in 1991 to try and obtain a job in the video game industry. Tallarico took a job as a keyboard salesman at a Guitar Center in Santa Ana, California. On his first day, Tallarico met an executive from Virgin Mastertronic. Shortly after, Tallarico was given a job at Virgin as one of their play-testers.

Career
While play-testing, Tallarico often asked his bosses to let him create video game music. Tallarico's first musical project at Virgin Interactive was for the Game Boy version of Prince of Persia. "The main focus of writing video game music back then was it had to be simple and have a great melody," Tallarico said. Tallarico worked on a number of other games while at Virgin Interactive, including The Terminator.

Tommy Tallarico Studios
Tallarico continued working with Virgin Interactive as head of music and video division until 1994, when he went on to found Tommy Tallarico Studios. David Perry formed Shiny Entertainment at the same time, and the two studios collaborated on Earthworm Jim and MDK. In 2005, Tallarico wrote part of an orchestral score for Advent Rising performed by the Mormon Tabernacle Choir.

In 2000 Joey Kuras (then employed at Tallarico Studios) created the "oof" sound effect for the game Messiah. Tallarico has at times claimed that Kuras created the sound, that it was a collaboration between the pair, and that he created it himself. The sound effect was subsequently used in Roblox from 2006 to 2020, played after a character died in-game, and became an iconic part of the game after its adoption by meme culture. Tallarico, who claims ownership of the sound, disputed Roblox's use of it in June 2019. This dispute ended in July 2022 when the Roblox Corporation pulled the sound from all games on its platform.

Television

In 1995, Victor Lucas—who runs the Electric Playground website—interviewed Tallarico at E3. The two built a rapport that enabled Lucas to ask Tallarico to work with him on a show. In 1997, Tallarico and Lucas wrote, produced, and co-hosted Electric Playground TV, which provided news, previews, and reviews on video games. Tallarico played the irreverent, raunchy funny man to Lucas's straight man. In 2002, the reviews section of Electric Playground—Reviews on the Run—was spun-off into its own program, which Tallarico and Lucas hosted as well. In the U.S., Reviews on the Run was broadcast on G4 TV as Judgment Day. The Electric Playground remains the longest-running video game television show in history.
In 2006, as Tallarico spent more time with his new project, Video Games Live, he started to spend less time on the show, missing almost all of 2007 and 2008. In 2009, Scott Jones took over his spot as full-time co-host with Victor Lucas.

Music concerts

In 2002, Tallarico co-founded Video Games Live, a symphony orchestra concert series that plays music from video games, with Jack Wall. Tallarico hosted and played guitar for the shows. He also created the visuals—scenes from video games, as well as lights and lasers—that are played in sync with the music. VGL has been awarded two Guinness World Records: one for the most video game concerts performed (357 at the time the record was awarded), and another for largest audience to ever view a video game music concert live (752,109 people in total, where 750,023 viewers watched online via the Youku app, and 2,086 people attended the concert in person at the Beijing Exhibition Center). It is not the largest symphony performance ever seen live, despite the claims of Tallarico, as the largest attendance at the classical music concert was 800,000 at the New York Philharmonic performance in New York in 1986.

Tallarico has produced seven VGL albums. The first album, Video Games Live Volume 1, debuted at No. 10 on Billboard Top 10 for Classical Music Crossovers, and was named 2008 Best Video Game Soundtrack for both IGN and G.A.N.G. The second volume, Level 2, also sold as a Blu-ray DVD concert, debuted at No. 8 on the same Billboard list. However, Tallarico received lukewarm support from the recording industry for the albums. He noted, "they don't believe in the culturally artistic significance of video game music, and they don't believe that people are interested in listening after the game is turned off." In response, Tallarico crowdsourced the third album Level 3 on Kickstarter. The project beat its goal and raised $285,081 for the album. Since then, Video Games Live has brought out two further albums, Level 4 and Level 5, through Kickstarter.

In 2014, Tallarico and electronic dance music artist BT began working on Electronic Opus. As with Video Games Live, Electronic Opus presents EDM music alongside a symphony orchestra. They used Kickstarter to fund an album, raising over $250,000. The show opened at the Miami Winter Music Conference in 2015.

In 2016, Tallarico co-produced the Capcom Live world tour with Shota Nakama.

Intellivision Entertainment

Following the death of Keith Robinson in 2017, founder of Intellivision Productions, Tallarico purchased a stake in the company from the estate. In May 2018, Intellivision Entertainment was re-formed with him as president. In the winter of that year, he announced the intent for the company to release the Intellivision Amico with the target of October 2020. 
As of July 2022, it is reportedly still being worked on. 
As of September 2022, the Amico has been delayed at least three times. The console has been viewed very negatively by critics, drawing criticism for its delays, fundraising tactics, and use of NFTs. The status of the console has been described as "grim" by TechRaptor and compared to a car crash by Kotaku.

In February 2022, Tallarico stepped down from his role as CEO of Intellivision, remaining on board as the company's president and largest shareholder. He was replaced by the company's former chief revenue officer Phil Adam.

Personal life
Tallarico is vegan. According to the LA Times, his house in San Juan Capistrano "looks as if a 12-year-old with a huge bank account went wild", including a life-size Indiana Jones, several Star Wars characters, and a statue of Merlin.

In 2002, Tallarico founded the Game Audio Network Guild, a non-profit to recognize video game music and audio. The guild hosts annual awards for achievement in game audio. Tallarico received the Ambassador Award at the 2009 Game Developers Choice Awards for his work with the Guild. In 2012, he received the Game Audio Network Guild's Lifetime Achievement Award.

Video games

Albums

References

External links

1968 births
Living people
20th-century American composers
20th-century American male musicians
21st-century American composers
21st-century American male musicians
American critics
American male composers
American people of Italian descent
American sound designers
American television personalities
Game Developers Conference Ambassador Award recipients
Musicians from Springfield, Massachusetts
Video game composers
Video game critics